Anirudh Singh (born 28 December 1983) is an English former first-class cricketer.

Singh was born at Birmingham in December 1983 to Indian parents from Uttar Pradesh who had emigrated to England. He was educated in Birmingham at King Edward's School, before going up to Gonville and Caius College, Cambridge. While studying at Cambridge, he made three appearances in first-class cricket for Cambridge University against Oxford University in The University Matches of 2003, 2004 and 2005. He also played for Cambridge UCCE in 2004, making two appearances. In five first-class matches, he scored 176 runs, making 113 for Cambridge University and 63 for Cambridge UCCE. His highest first-class score of 75 came for Cambridge University in The University Match of 2005 at Fenner's. His brother, Anurag, captained Cambridge University and played first-class cricket at county level.

Notes and references

External links

1983 births
Living people
People from Birmingham, West Midlands
English people of Indian descent
British Asian cricketers
British sportspeople of Indian descent
People educated at King Edward's School, Birmingham
Alumni of Gonville and Caius College, Cambridge
English cricketers
Cambridge University cricketers
Cambridge MCCU cricketers